The 3N170 is an enhancement mode N-Channel MOSFET standard product designed for use as a general purpose amplifier or switch. The part was produced previously by Intersil, Motorola, and others.  It is currently produced by Linear Integrated Systems, Inc.

Part characteristics
Characteristics include:
 Low switching voltages
 Fast switching times
 Low drain-source resistance
 Low reverse transfer capacitance

References

MOSFETs
Commercial transistors